Fiona Patricia Galloway (born 18 October 1966) is a former New Zealand female sailor. She competed at the 1988 Summer Olympics in the sailing event.

References 

1966 births
Living people
New Zealand female sailors (sport)
Sailors at the 1988 Summer Olympics – 470
Olympic sailors of New Zealand
People from Levin, New Zealand